The Jersey Indians were a minor league baseball team based in Jersey City, New Jersey, which played in the Eastern League for the 1977 season in Jersey City, New Jersey. They were an AA affiliate of the Cleveland Indians. The team's home stadium was Roosevelt Stadium.

See also
Jersey City A's
Jersey City Skeeters
Jersey City Giants
Jersey City Jerseys

References
The Hudson Reporter: Jersey City's Baseball History

Jersey Indians
Jersey Indians
Jersey Indians
Jersey Indians
Professional baseball teams in New Jersey
Defunct baseball teams in New Jersey
1977 establishments in New Jersey
1977 disestablishments in New Jersey
Baseball teams established in 1977
Baseball teams disestablished in 1977
Jersey City, New Jersey